The Principality of Peremyshl was a medieval petty principality centred on Peremyshl (now Przemyśl, Poland) in the Cherven lands ("Red Rus'").

First mentioning
The Rus' Primary Chronicle, writing for the year 981, gives the first mention of Peremyshl relating the wars of Saint Vladimir:  
It is possible that the Lyakhs here are the Poles. Cross argued that Lyakh was the early term for a Polish person. Franklin and Shepard argued that these people are the same as the Ledzanians, mentioned in the 10th century De Administrando Imperio as tributaries of the Rus. Peremyshl may have been one of the Cherven towns captured by the Polish prince Boleslaw I in 1018, towns recaptured by Rus in 1031.

Rostislavichi
Peremyshl was ruled initially by the descendants of Vladimir Yaroslavich — who had helped recapture the towns of Cherven Rus in 1031 — and his only son Rostislav Vladimirovich; they are hence known as the Rostislavichi. The earliest known Prince of Peremyshl is Ryurik Rostislavich, who was occupying the city when the murderers of Yaropolk Izyaslavich fled to him in 1087.  Vsevolod I Yaroslavich, Grand Prince, is alleged to have apportioned Volhynian territories, distributing Vladimir-in-Volhynia (modern Volodymyr-Volynskyi) to Davyd Igorevich, Terebovl to Vasilko Rostislavich and Peremyshl to Volodar Rostislavich, grants confirmed at the Council of Liubech of 1097. The city, defended by Prince Volodar, was besieged in 1097 by Yaroslav Svyatopolkovich, allied to King Coloman of Hungary. However Davyd Svyatoslavich, Prince of Chernigov, and his Polovtsy ally Bonyak defeated the Hungarians.

Peremyshl, although originally subordinate to the Principality of Vladimir-in-Volhynia, remained a semi-independent principality into the middle of the 13th century and beyond. Although the details are not always available, it formed part of the orbit of the emerging Principality of Halych. During the conflict between Rostislav Mikhailovich and Daniil Romanovich (formerly its prince), it was one of the former's strongholds; its bishop supported Rostislav, and when Rostislav occupied Halych, he appointed Konstantin of Ryazan to oversee Peremyshl. Peremyshl is known to have been the main fort of Boleslaw-Yuri, King of Rus, going into Polish hands after his death.

Princes of Peremyshl

See also
Red Ruthenia

Notes

References
 
 
 
 
 

 

Przemyśl
Subdivisions of Kievan Rus'